Matthew Bierlein is an American politician from Michigan. Bierlein is a Republican member of the Michigan House of Representatives from District 97.

Education 
Bierlein is a graduate of Vassar High School. He received his bachelor's degree from Spring Arbor University.

Career 
Prior to his election to the Michigan House of Representatives, Matthew worked in the manufacturing industry. A native of Tuscola County, Matthew served on the Tuscola County Board of Commissioners from January 2, 2013 to January 1, 2019. While serving his county he was the boards vice-chair and also served as President of the Michigan Association of Counties and on the board of directors for the National Association of County Officers.

Between his time as a member of the Board of Commissioners and the State House, Matthew served as the district director for State Senator Kevin Daley.

Personal life 
In 2010, Matthew married Mindy Bierlein, together they have three children, Matthew, Madison, and Maddox

Electoral history

2022

References 

1982 births
Living people
People from Tuscola County, Michigan
County commissioners in Michigan
Spring Arbor University alumni
Republican Party members of the Michigan House of Representatives
21st-century American politicians